Beta-apo-4'-carotenal oxygenase (beta-apo-4'-carotenal dehydrogenase, YLO-1, carD (gene)) is an enzyme with systematic name 4'-apo-beta,psi-carotenal:NAD+ oxidoreductase. This enzyme catalyses the following chemical reaction:

 4'-apo-beta, psi-caroten-4'-al + NAD+ + H2O  neurosporaxanthin + NADH + 2 H+

Neurosporaxanthin is responsible for the orange color of Neurospora.

References

External links 
 

EC 1.2.1